Ngok Lual Yak  is an African sub-tribe, within the Jiëŋ (Dinka) group. They are mainly found in Malakal, South Sudan and inhabit the land along the confluences of the Nile and Sobat rivers. It is believed that the sub-tribe numbers about 95,000. They are devoted ethnics and believe in Deŋdit as their provider. Some of Ngok sections are part of Bor Community and sections who identifies themselves as descendants of Ngok could still be traced!

History 

In the 17th century, it was believed that the People of Ngokland (Ngok Lual Yak) came to the shore of River Nile from the other side of the Lower Nile. Moving from the west to the east, they came to control the region of the Upper Nile River, pushing out the Funj and Jur, the Achol Eliot (Acholi?). In the 18th century, with the arrival of the Nuer, Lual Yak together with his age-group and Ngok at large was forced to evacuate some areas, like Gaak-yuom in Bor, Jokou in Gajaak, Pakoop in Ayuaal, Pabiech in Kongoor and Piny-Wuut.

They were pushed by the Nuer along the Sobat into the mouth of the Nile in Malakal. The Ngok Lual Yak became the owners of the land that runs from Malakal to Dome (Dömë), Dini and Abwong (Abɔ̈ŋ) Cheng Nyankiir along the River Sobat into the Nile at Malakal. The main borders with Nuer are Nyinrool as the border with Lou Nuer, Cuei on the side of Kurmiyom with Jikeny and Aboorbioong on the Lang-nom (Ulang) side and Nyinwak with Nuer Yom (Gajaak).

The Ngokland people lived in two groups, namely Yom and Weny. Each group was further divided into sections and again into subsections. Ngok Lual Yak people owned NgokLand. They developed a skillful traditional culture and a close spiritual bond with the land. Early settlers were experts in hunting, fishing, farming, grazing  and were skillful in spear and stick fighting. NgokLand ownership was by and for the people of Ngok Lual Yak.

People, land and early migration 

Ngok Lual Yak as a group is an original Jieng Group. The Jieng began with the single family of  Deng with his wife Abuk. One myth tells that Deng after his mythical death turned out to be an unreasonable phenomena, thus deriving the Jieng to worship Deng as commonly known today as Dengdit.

Another myth explains that Deng is regarded as the main source that generate water. This caused the crops to grow. Facts about the Dengdit are yet to be known, but is akin to the Biblical story of Adam and Eve. Deng and Abuk are the twin marital progenitors of the Jieng Origin. Deng and Abuk are where Ngok People came from.

Ngok Lual Yak as a tribe branched out of Jieng group and staked out its own historical line. Ngok Lual Yak converged into the following groups.

Ngok Lual Yak groups

Yom group 
Tol 
Awier 
Baliet 
Yom 
Duut 
Balak 
Dhiaak

Weny group 
Paan Man Gok 
Ajuba 
Adong

Paan Man Weny
Abiei 
Ngaar 
Achaak 
Jook 
Diing

Other Ngok groups 

Ngok is part of the biggest chain of the other groups of Ngok like Ngok de Jook. Historically Ngok is an umbrella name for the different groups, including the NgokLand People of Ngok Lual Yak. Following are the other groups of Ngok.

The following Ngok groups are either historically related or partly blood-related groups. Out of these groups, some are commonly known as the Pan Ayuel Jeel Family.

Earlier Ngok group, according to migration history

Ngok de Jok Group 
Ngok de Jok
nyok mathiang

Ruweeng 
Paanaruu  
Aloor 
Paweny

Dongjol 
Nyiel  
Angaach
Ageer  
Abilang  
Padang Hol  
Nyarweng

Marbek 
Hol  
Luac  
Duaar 
Angaach  
Rut & Thoi

Ruweng are counted as independent Groups due to their population expansion but emerged from within Ngok.

People and land 

Ngokland is an area on the Sobat river extending from Dome to Baliet and from Akoka to Renk on the eastern side of the White Nile including Melut and Paloc. More lived along the Sobat than along the Nile in Baliet. The civil wars of 1955 and 1983 affected their distribution. NgokLand sinclude Baliet, Dakjur (Adong), Tubuu, Gel Dhiaak, Abwong (Abɔ̈ŋ), Gel Achol and to Dome (Dömë) up to Abwong Cheng Nyankiir. The land features many broad tree lines and a pastoral grassland within the central area. Many tributaries divide the land. Most live on the western bank of the river. Traditionally, most of the western bank was the domain of influential  NgokLand settlers. It is also the most olden prestigious heritage of the group.

Populations and resettlement 

The exact Population number of Ngokland people of Ngok Lual Yak is not  known, but was approximated at 80-95,000 in the 1950s.

Climate 

Ngokland seasons are different to the southern hemispheres'. February, March late April are the hottest months and is called the summer season. The rainy season is from mid-May to the full month of October. And from August to earlier October is Autumn (not confirmed). Spring is from May to July (not confirmed). Winter is in early November, December to late January.

Government and politics

South Sudan National Government 

The government of South Sudan has ten states and its headquarter in Juba. The SPLA/M ruling party is a formal rebel group. The party emerged after a civil war of 21 years. The leader is Salva Kiir Mayaardit, a Jieng. The SPLA/M held the majority in all 10 states as well as in the National Government. Under Salva Kiir, the Ngok Lual Yak have one MP in the National Government and many ranked Generals within the SPLA.

South Sudan State Government 

Before November 2011, Ngokland people were represented at the state level of the Upper Nile. During the 2010 election, the representation of the Ngokland people dropped, leaving them no MP at the state level in Malakal.

Religion 

The majority of people in Ngokland are Christians. Protestant Churches emerged in 1900. Among them is the Presbyterian Church of Sudan. Catholic and Trinity churches are present, plus non-believers who adhere to their traditional deeds.

Language or dialect 

Jieng have a dialect. The Ngok Lual Yak speak in Jieng dialect. In the 1930s, a written form of Jieng was developed following the arrival of Europeans. Characters including ŋ, NY, Y and NH were incorporated. Thoŋ de Jiëŋ later became unintelligible due poor teaching. Earlier, Jieng was spoken on a regular basis and taught to children.

Currency 

Before South Sudan seceded, the Dinar was in use in NgokLand. After South Sudan currency became available, the Dinar was phased out and the pound became the currency. The pound was available in 100 SSPd, 50 SSPd, 25 SSPd, 20SSPd, 10SSPd, 5SSpd and 1SSPd units.

Telecommunications 

A Zain company operates the phone network. Zain offered regional, national and international call services.

References

External links 
 Composed Traditional Songs
 Ngok Lual Yak History - 2001, Kakuma, Zone 3,G34B 
 Chol Kiir Dau Maat Akeel interchat - 2012, Ngokland
 (Ethnics Distribution) IMU OCHA South Sudan - 24/12/2009
 Common Traditional Tale History of Origin - Ngokland 2012

 
Ethnic groups in South Sudan